Tamae Watanabe (Japanese , Watanabe Tamae; born 21 November 1938, in Yamanashi Prefecture) is a Japanese mountain climber.

After completing study at Tsuru University she worked as public office employee of Kanagawa Prefecture. It was at this time, at age 28, she began mountain climbing.  In 1977 she climbed Mount McKinley. She then climbed Mont Blanc, Mount Kilimanjaro and Aconcagua.

After her retirement she returned to her hometown and in May 2002 she became the then oldest woman to climb Mount Everest. Ten years later, in May 2012, she broke her own record, when she, now at the age of 73, again scaled Mount Everest.

See also
List of Mount Everest summiters by number of times to the summit

References

1938 births
Japanese mountain climbers
Living people
Japanese summiters of Mount Everest
Female climbers